Survitec Group is a British manufacturer of personal survival equipment for usage after ejecting from aircraft or when at sea.

History

RFD
Reginald Foster Dagnall formed RFD in 1920 in Surrey. Beaufort had been founded in 1852.

RFD liferafts and dinghies were used extensively in World War II for allied aircrew.

RFD Beaufort pioneered submarine escape technology in the 1950s, known as Submarine Escape Immersion Equipment (SEIE).

Survitec
The Survitec Group was actually formed in 2000. In 2001 it bought DSB (Deutsche Schlauchboot GmbH). In 2009, The Shark Group (founded in 1975) closed its Northumberland site and production was moved to Birkenhead.

In 2004 it was bought by Montagu Private Equity for £146 million.

In January 2010 Survitec was bought by the private equity firm Warburg Pincus from Montagu Private Equity for £280 million.

In December 2010, it bought Revere Supply Inc of Florida, to become SSPI.

In May 2011 Survitec began the process of acquiring two further companies; Grimsby-based Cosalt Marine, for £31 million. and the commercial liferaft and MES business of Bordeaux-based Zodiac.  Cosalt Marine, employed over 450 people at 21 worldwide sites, with a turnover of £57 million.

Structure
Its headquarters and registered office is on Beaufort Road in Birkenhead. The RFD Beaufort factory in Birkenhead is on the A5030 between Poulton and Claughton, next to the Great Float. The RFD Beaufort factory in Dunmurry is on the A1.

It has servicing plants around the world:
 Sharon Center, Ohio, USA - RFD Beaufort Inc
 Grimsby, United Kingdom
 Grosseto, Tuscany, Italy - Eurovinil
Plymouth, England
 Eschershausen, Niedersachsen, Germany - DSB (Deutsche Schlauchboot GmbH)
 Les Attaques, Pas-de-Calais, France - RFD France
 Belgium - Antwerp, Ostend
 Netherlands - Grou, Rotterdam
 Spain - Algeciras, Barcelona
 Birkenhead - RFD Beaufort
 Dunmurry - RFD Beaufort
 Dyce, Aberdeen - SurvivalOne and Shark Group (formerly in Broomhill, Northumberland)
 Aberdeen -  - Survitec Survival Craft
 Yokohama, Kanagawa Prefecture, Japan - RFD Japan
 Shanghai, China - WH Brennan
 Hong Kong - WH Brennan WH Brennan
 Singapore - WH Brennan WH Brennan
 Australia Auburn, New South Wales, Sydney, Australia - RFD Australia, Freemantle, Melbourne, Slacks Creek
 New Zealand - Auckland, Christchurch, Nelson, Wellington
 Gosport, UK ("Crewsaver") 
 Canada - Dartmouth, Mount Pearl, Vancouver ("DBC") 
 Norway - Aalesund, Bergen, Stokmarnes, Kristiansand
 Sweden - Gothenburg

Customers
Customers include
 Ministry of Defence
 US Navy
 US Air Force
 Royal Australian Air Force
 Royal Australian Navy
 Shell
 Lockheed Martin
 BAE Systems
 Carnival Cruise Lines
 Royal Caribbean Cruises
 Princess Cruises

References

General references
 Northumberland factory closes in March 2009

External links
 Survitec Group
 RFD Beaufort Marine

Aircraft component manufacturers of the United Kingdom
County Antrim
Manufacturing companies established in 1920
Rescue equipment
Survival equipment
1920 establishments in England